Veraaiersnek Pass is situated in the Mpumalanga province, on the Regional road R36 (Mpumalanga) between Lydenburg and Ohrigstad (South Africa).

Mountain passes of Mpumalanga